Betta Lemme (born April 30, 1993) is a Canadian singer, songwriter, director and multi-instrumentalist.

Early life
Lemme is born in Montreal, Quebec, Canada. She is Italian-Canadian, with her second-generation Canadian parents being both of Italian descent (from Calabria and Abruzzo). Her first language growing up was Italian; once in Quebec's francophone school system, she began speaking primarily French at home.

At the age of 2, she first became drawn to music when trying to learn the Addams Family theme song on her grandmother's piano.

Betta Lemme attended post-secondary school majoring in photography and film.

Before pursuing a career in music, she worked multiple jobs related to fashion and photography including being a model, working as an independent booking agent and as a social media consultant.

She had been writing and playing music in Montreal, but after being told by a college music professor that she wouldn't be able to study music due to not being able to read music notes and being rejected from music school, she eventually decided to move to New York in 2016 as an attempt to pursue a career in music and find collaborators on her own. While living in New York, Betta happened to rent from Tucker Halpern of the American DJ duo Sofi Tukker. Their friendship lead to music collaboration.

Music career
On July 8, 2016, Betta Lemme was featured on a single titled "Awoo" which she co-wrote with American DJ duo Sofi Tukker. It was released on the duo's self-published debut EP Soft Animals. On October 17 of the same year, a music video for "Awoo" was released by Ultra Music. The music video with Betta includes dance choreography by her which is also performed live during shows with Sofi Tukker.

Lemme's debut single "Bambola" was released officially on 10 November 2017. The official video released on the same day has reached over 78 million views on YouTube. On 29 January 2018, Lemme made her first-televised debut performing her single, "Bambola" on RAI 1's Che tempo che fa. She appeared as a guest performer on The Voice of Italy 2018, singing "Bambola" with the three finalists.

On June 25, 2021, Betta Lemme released the LGBT-themed song "Girls" coming out about her sexuality.

Personal life
Betta Lemme is fluent in French, English and speaks Italian. She identifies as sexually fluid.

Features 
"Kick the Door" was featured in the episode "Rite of Thunder" of Marvel's Runaways in 2019. "Give It" was featured in the closing credit for The Craft: Legacy. 
The single "Bambola" was featured in the bowling alley date scene in To All the Boys: Always and Forever.
The single "Kick The Door" was featured in trailers of the game Riders Republic by Ubisoft.
In 2022, the Merk & Kremont Remix of "Bambola" was featured in the scene of Ava and Beatrice dancing in season 2 of Warrior Nun.

Discography

Extended plays

Singles

Other appearances

References

External links 

 Official website

1993 births
Living people
Canadian people of Italian descent
Canadian women singer-songwriters
Canadian LGBT singers
Canadian LGBT songwriters
People from Montreal
Sexually fluid women
21st-century Canadian women singers
21st-century Canadian LGBT people